Legend is an EP by American hip hop group House of Pain. It was released in 1994, shortly before the release of the full-length album Same As It Ever Was. Two songs that appeared on this EP, "Word Is Bond" and "It Ain't a Crime" would appear on Same As It Ever Was. However, the song "Legend" remains exclusive to the EP.

Track listing

External links

1994 debut EPs
House of Pain albums
Albums produced by DJ Muggs
Albums produced by Diamond D
Albums produced by DJ Lethal
1994 remix albums
Remix EPs
Tommy Boy Records remix albums
Tommy Boy Records EPs